James William Grant may refer to:

 James W. Grant (born 1943), American banker and politician
 James William Grant (astronomer) (1788–1865), Scottish astronomer and landowner